Gavestan (also Romanized as Gāvestān; also known as Kārestān and Kāvestān) is a village in Saghder Rural District, Jebalbarez District, Jiroft County, Kerman Province, Iran. At the 2006 census, its population was 35, in 8 families.

References 

Populated places in Jiroft County